Frank Giering (23 November 1971 – 23 June 2010) was a German actor.

Biography
Giering studied at the HFF Potsdam. He starred in a production of The Secret Diary of Adrian Mole and was cast by Austrian filmmaker, Michael Haneke for the TV movie, The Traitor and the 1997 films The Castle and Funny Games.

Giering's portrayal of the psychopathic killer, ‘Peter’ in "Funny Games" was considered a breakout performance.

Giering was regularly seen in TV and cinema productions. His best known roles were in Sebastian Schipper's Absolute Giganten (1999) as Floyd, and in the film Baader (2002), portraying the leader of the Red Army Faction. Since 2006, Giering starred in the ZDF series Der Kriminalist as the Commissioner Henry Weber. He appeared in 30 episodes up until 2010.

Death
Giering was found dead in his apartment in Berlin on 23 June 2010. Giering had publicly discussed his struggles with alcoholism and emotional issues.

Filmography
 1996:  (TV film)
 1997: The Castle (TV film)
 1997: Funny Games
 1998: Tatort:  (TV)
 1998: Opernball (TV film)
 1998: Das merkwürdige Verhalten geschlechtsreifer Großstädter zur Paarungszeit
 1998: Und alles wegen Mama (TV film)
 1999: Absolute Giganten
 2000: Bloody Weekend
 2000: Gran Paradiso
 2000: 
 2000: Exit to Heaven
 2000: Ebene 9 (Short)
 2002: Baader
 2002:  (TV film)
 2003: The Curve (Short)
 2003: Anatomy 2
 2003: Hierankl
 2004: 
 2004:  (TV film)
 2004-2006: Eva Blond (TV series, 4 episodes)
 2006: Esperanza
 2006:  (TV film)
 2006-2011: Der Kriminalist (TV series, 36 episodes)
 2007: 
 2008: Tatort:  (TV)
 2009: Lasko – Die Faust Gottes (TV series): Der Fluch
 2009:  (TV film)
 2009: Die Bremer Stadtmusikanten (TV film)

References

External links
 

1971 births
2010 deaths
Actors from Magdeburg
Male actors from Berlin
German male film actors
German male television actors
20th-century German male actors
21st-century German male actors